Konnevesi is a lake in Finland. Konnevesi is a rather large lake in the Kymijoki main catchment area. It is located in the regions Pohjois-Savo and Keski-Suomi. There is a plan (year 2014) to establish a new National Park to the Southern Konnevesi. Quality of water is excellent.

References

External links

 Lake Konnevesi in the Jarviwiki Web Service 

Konnevesi
Landforms of Central Finland
Konnevesi
Konnevesi
Konnevesi